Peter Winterburn (died June 21, 2019)  was a Canadian academic.

He was the NSERC/AcmeLabs/Bureau Veritas Minerals Industrial Research Chair in Exploration Geochemistry at the University of British Columbia  and had recently moved to Chile.

He held a PhD from the University of Edinburgh, Scotland and a BSc from University of Aston, Birmingham, England.

Winterburn was murdered in Valparaiso, Chile in 2019.

References

External links
Google Scholar
ResearchGate biography

Academic staff of the University of British Columbia
2019 deaths
Canadian chemists
Deaths by stabbing in Chile
Alumni of Aston University
Alumni of the University of Edinburgh
Year of birth missing